Simmler is a surname. Notable people with the surname include:

 Josias Simmler (Josiah Simler, Simlerus; 1530–1576), Swiss theologian and classicist
 Józef Simmler (1823–1868), Polish painter
 Wilhelm Simmler (1840–1923), German painter and illustrator